Kari Ukkonen (born 19 February 1961) is a Finnish former football player and current football manager. As player, Ukkonen was fielded as defender as well as midfielder.

Ukkonen represented Finland at the 1980 Summer Olympics in Moscow. Three years later, he earned his first cap for Finland in a 1–1 draw against Poland. The same year, Ukkonen was voted Finnish Footballer of the Year by sports journalists and the Football Association of Finland.

In between, in 1982, Ukkonen had moved from Finland to Belgium, when he was bought by Cercle Brugge. Ukkonen made his Belgian début on 13 November, when Cercle defeated SV Waregem with 2–1. Ukkonen would go on to win the Belgian Cup with Cercle in 1985. Ukkonen would spend most of his career in Belgium, also playing for other First division teams as Lokeren, Anderlecht and Royal Antwerp. Ukkonen ended his playing career with French side LB Châteauroux. He stayed in football as manager. First he was coach of Finland's national youth team. He was head coach of Finland at the 2001 World Youth Championship in Argentina. His next job was manager of Turun Palloseura.

Honours
Belgian Cup:
Winner (4): 1985, 1988, 1989, 1992
Runner-up (1): 1986
Belgian First Division:
Winner (1): 1990–91
Runner-up (2): 1988–89, 1989–90

References

Cerclemuseum.be 
Kari Ukkonen player profile 

1961 births
Living people
Finnish footballers
Finland international footballers
Association football defenders
Association football midfielders
Finnish football managers
People from Kuopio
Olympic footballers of Finland
Footballers at the 1980 Summer Olympics
Cercle Brugge K.S.V. players
K.S.C. Lokeren Oost-Vlaanderen players
R.S.C. Anderlecht players
Royal Antwerp F.C. players
LB Châteauroux players
Belgian Pro League players
Expatriate footballers in Belgium
Expatriate footballers in France
Association football utility players
TPS Turku football managers
Mestaruussarja players
Sportspeople from North Savo